This is a list of countries by distribution of wealth, including Gini coefficients. Wealth distribution can vary greatly from income distribution in a country (see List of countries by income equality).

Higher Gini coefficients signify greater wealth inequality, with 0 being complete equality, whereas a value near 1 can arise if everybody has zero wealth except a very small minority.

Countries that have high-quality wealth taxes and honest reporting from financial institutions, such as the Netherlands and Norway, tend to have more reliable wealth inequality statistics.

List
The table below is for 2018. The GDP data is based on data from the World Bank. The population data is based on data from the UN. The Wealth Gini coefficients from 2008 are based on a working paper published by the National Bureau of Economic Research. The Wealth Gini numbers come from the Global Wealth Databook 2018 by Credit Suisse. Also the Gini Wealth coefficients for 2019 are shown.

* indicates "Wealth inequality in COUNTRY or TERRITORY" or "Income inequality in COUNTRY or TERRITORY" links.

See also
 List of countries by wealth per adult
 Income inequality metrics
 List of countries by income equality
 List of countries by GDP (nominal)
 List of countries by GDP (nominal) per capita
 List of countries by GDP (PPP)
 List of countries by GDP (PPP) per capita
 List of countries by Human Development Index
 List of countries by external debt
 List of countries by public debt

References

External links
 The World Distribution of Household Wealth. February 2008. By James B. Davies, Susanna Sandström, Anthony Shorrocks, and Edward N. Wolff. United Nations University World Institute for Development Economics Research (UNU-WIDER).
 Estimating the Level and Distribution of Global Household Wealth. November 2007. By James B. Davies, Susanna Sandström, Anthony Shorrocks, and Edward N. Wolff. UNU-WIDER.
 The World Distribution of Household Wealth. July 2007. By James B. Davies, Susanna Sandström, Anthony Shorrocks, and Edward N. Wolff. Center for Global, International and Regional Studies. University of California, Santa Cruz.
 The World Distribution of Household Wealth. 5 December 2006. By James B. Davies, Susanna Sandstrom, Anthony Shorrocks, and Edward N. Wolff. Tables to the 2006 report in Excel (including Gini coefficients for 229 countries). UNU-WIDER.
 World's richest 1% own 40% of all wealth, UN report discovers. 6 December 2006. By James Randerson. The Guardian.
 It's the Inequality, Stupid. March/April 2011 Issue. Mother Jones (magazine). Many charts, with sources.
 Who Rules America: Wealth, Income, and Power. July 2011. By G. William Domhoff. Many charts, and sources. See table 4 for wealth distribution by country. See table 7 for income distribution by country.
 Alan Grayson says United States has fifth-most unequal wealth distribution in world. 10 October 2011. PolitiFact.
 CHARTS: Here's What The Wall Street Protesters Are So Angry About.... 11 October 2011. Business Insider.
 OECD 2015 In It Together Chapter 1 Overview Inequality. 21 May 2015. Organisation for Economic Co-operation and Development. More recent Gini data p. 41.

Economic inequality
Global inequality
Gross domestic product

International rankings
Countries by wealth inequality
Wealth Equality